Darach Fahy (born 2000) is an Irish hurler who plays for Galway Senior Championship club Ardrahan and at inter-county level with the Galway senior hurling team. He usually lines out at as a goalkeeper.

Career

Fahy first came to prominence in the various juvenile and underage grades with the Ardrahan club. He first appeared on the inter-county scene as goalkeeper with the Galway minor team that won the 2017 All-Ireland Championship before ending the season as goalkeeper on the Team of the Year. Fahy subsequently played for two years with the Galway under-20 team before making his senior debut during the 2020 Walsh Cup.

Career statistics

Honours

Galway
National Hurling League: 2021
All-Ireland Minor Hurling Championship: 2017

References

2000 births
Living people
Ardrahan hurlers
Galway inter-county hurlers
Hurling goalkeepers